Denise María Sanz Laurel (born September 30, 1987), better known as Denise Laurel, is a Filipino actress and singer. She is half-Spanish and half-Filipino. She is a granddaughter of former vice president Salvador Laurel and great-granddaughter of former president José P. Laurel on her father's side, while on her mother's side, she is the great-granddaughter of Don Francisco "Paco" Sanz, former governor of Romblon and Palawan and the great-grandniece of former president Manuel Roxas. She is best known for playing roles in various ABS-CBN dramas, such as the Precious Hearts Romances series' Midnight Phantom and Kristine, Dahil sa Pag-ibig, Annaliza and most recently Nasaan Ka Nang Kailangan Kita. She was also the grand winner of the second season of the Philippine edition of Your Face Sounds Familiar. Laurel is a member of Star Magic and is a former GMA Network artist.

Personal life
Laurel is the granddaughter of former Vice President, the late Salvador Laurel and her grandmother Celia Díaz, and the great-granddaughter of former Philippine President, the late José P. Laurel. She is the youngest daughter of David Laurel and Ruby Sanz. She has a son named Alejandro born in 2011.

Laurel became engaged to professional basketball player Sol Mercado in March 2014. However, on October 20, 2016, Laurel announced through her Instagram account that they had ended their relationship.

Career
Laurel was discovered by Johnny Manahan in a play produced by Repertory Philippines. Luckily, she was given a break to be part of Ang TV 2, and then played Ina Raymundo's daughter in Pangako Sa ‘Yo.

She then made a name in Singapore when she was part of MTV Asia's Rouge, which was shown all over Asia. Among the many who auditioned, she stood out and got the role of a smart lead vocalist named Pat. At the age of 16, her experience in working with other nationalities taught her things that helped her improve her craft. After a season in Rouge, Laurel decided to concentrate on her local showbiz career.

After her return to the Philippines, she was part of the teen-oriented show Click, TAPE Inc.'s Walang Hanggan and Leya, and two telefantasyas Mulawin and Encantadia.
|
She went back to ABS-CBN, and starred in Abt Ur Luv, and in the fifth season of Komiks, where she played an engkantao. In 2008, ABS-CBN started the Precious Hearts Romances Presents series in which Laurel was prominently featured. Thus far, she had starred in four of the series' adaptations: Bud Brothers, You're Mine, Only Mine, Midnight Phantom and Kristine. She started getting recognition when she did the series, most notably in Midnight Phantom and Kristine opposite her friend Rafael Rosell. Her team-up with Rosell had been a hit with the viewers, thus they were teamed up again in Dahil sa Pag-ibig. After Dahil sa Pag-ibig, Laurel starred in her fifth PHR series entitled Pintada, where she played a teacher with a mysterious past.

In 2013, Laurel played an antagonist role in the last PHR series Paraiso, and later became part of the pre-primetime family drama series Annaliza that was aired until March 2014, portraying Isabel. She starred in the afternoon melodrama series Nasaan Ka Nang Kailangan Kita in 2015. The said series was set to replace Faith in the first quarter of the year on primetime, but it instead was an afternoon program. On the same year after NKNKK, Laurel auditioned for the 2nd season of Your Face Sounds Familiar, where she would go on to be titled as the grand winner.

Filmography

Television

Film

Discography

Non-album songs
"I Will Take You Forever" with Kris Lawrence (Christopher Cross and Frances Ruffelle cover)
"Head Over Heels" (The Go-Go's cover)
"My Memory of Him" (single for Endless Love: Winter Sonata)
"If I Ain't Got You" (Alicia Keys cover)
"Disco Lights" (Ultrabeat cover)
"Love You Anyway" (original song)

References

External links

1987 births
Denise
Actresses from Metro Manila
Filipino child actresses
Filipino television actresses
Living people
Singers from Metro Manila
Star Magic
ABS-CBN personalities
Tagalog people
Your Face Sounds Familiar winners
21st-century Filipino singers
21st-century Filipino women singers